The Change Party is a political party in Mali led by Moussa Mara.

History
The party was officially registered on 9 April 2010. In the 2013 presidential election Mara finished in eleventh place with 1.5% of the vote. The 2013 parliamentary elections saw the party win a single seat in the National Assembly.

References

Political parties in Mali
Political parties established in 2010